Asador Etxebarri is a Spanish restaurant in Atxondo (Biscay), Basque Country which was voted 3rd best of the World's 101 Best Steak Restaurants and was also voted 3rd best in the world in Restaurant (magazine) Top 50 Awards in 2019 and 2021 and 6th in 2015.  The chef is Victor Arguinzoniz, who cooks everything over a grill. Thus, all courses, even dessert, have the taste of fire. Victor Arguinzoniz, the owner and chef was born in the same village, next to the restaurant, and worked in a flag factory for many years before buying the restaurant with his father and uncle. He taught himself to cook and built his own kitchen full of manual grilling contraptions using multiple types of wood. Victor loves to barbecue and he is rarely seen out of the kitchen. He is known for juicy Palamós prawns, homemade chorizo tartare and finally a huge tomahawk steak before dessert. Wines are chosen by Mohamed Benabdallah  who was previously at Mugaritz.

References

External links
Official web site

Michelin Guide starred restaurants in Spain
Restaurants in Spain
Buildings and structures in Biscay